Marco Praga (born Milan, 20 June 1862; died 31 January 1929) was an Italian playwright popular in his era. His two most successful plays were La vergini and La moglie ideale (1890), which reportedly contained one of Eleonora Duse's great roles. He continued to do notable works until 1915. He collaborated in the preparation of the libretto for Giacomo Puccini's Manon Lescaut.

His father was poet Emilio Praga.

References
Encyclopedia Americana (1969), pg 502

External links
 
 

1862 births
1929 deaths
Italian dramatists and playwrights
Writers from Milan
1929 suicides
Suicides in Italy